Nădăştia may refer to:

 Nădăştia, a village in Almașu Mare Commune, Alba County, Romania
 Nădăştia de Jos and Nădăştia de Sus, villages in Călan Town, Hunedoara County, Romania
 Nădăștia River, a tributary of the Strei River in Romania